The Play-offs of the 2013 Fed Cup Asia/Oceania Zone Group I were the final stages of the Group I Zonal Competition involving teams from Asia and Oceania. Using the positions determined in their pools, the seven teams faced off to determine their placing in the 2013 Fed Cup Asia/Oceania Zone Group I. The top team advanced to the World Group II, and the bottom team was relegated down to the Group II for the next year.

Pool Standings

Promotion play-offs
The first placed teams of each pool were drawn in a head-to-head round. The winner of the round advanced to the World Group II play-offs, where they'd get a chance to advanced to World Group II.

Kazakhstan vs. Uzbekistan

3rd to 4th play-offs
The second placed teams of each pool were drawn in head-to-head rounds to find the third and fourth placed teams.

China vs. Thailand

Relegation play-offs
The last placed teams of each pool were drawn in a head-to-head round. The loser of each round was relegated down to Asia/Oceania Zone Group II in 2013.

India vs. South Korea

Final Placements

  advanced to the World Group II play-offs, and were drawn against . They lost 1–4, and thus was relegated back to Group I for 2014.
  was relegated down to 2014 Fed Cup Asia/Oceania Zone Group II.

See also
Fed Cup structure

References

External links
 Fed Cup website

2013 Fed Cup Asia/Oceania Zone